Kent McCray (June 7, 1928 – June 3, 2018) was an American television producer. He produced many television programs, including Little House on the Prairie.

The son of Mr. and Mrs. Tom McCray, he studied at the Hartt School performing arts conservatory at the University of Hartford in Connecticut.

In addition to Little House on the Prairie, McCray worked on Bonanza, The Red Skelton Show, and This Is Your Life. He also was associate producer with Bob Hope and worked with many of Hope's USO tours overseas.

In 2005, McCray donated $100,000 to the Hartt School's television studio. In return, the university named the facility the Kent McCray Television Studio.

References

External links 
 
 

1928 births
2018 deaths
Businesspeople from Hartford, Connecticut
People from Los Angeles
University of Hartford alumni
Television producers from California
20th-century American businesspeople